Burwan (also spelled Barwan) is a village, with a police station, in the Burwan CD block in the Kandi subdivision of Murshidabad district in the state of West Bengal, India.

Geography

Location

Area overview
The area shown in the map alongside, covering Berhampore and Kandi subdivisions, is spread across both the natural physiographic regions of the district, Rarh and Bagri. The headquarters of Murshidabad district, Berhampore, is in this area. The entire area is overwhelmingly rural with over 80% of the population living in the rural areas.

Note: The map alongside presents some of the notable locations in the subdivisions. All places marked in the map are linked in the larger full screen map.

Demographics
According to the 2011 Census of India, Barwan had a total population of 8,974, of which 4,558 (51%) were males and 4,416 (49%) were females. Population in the age range 0–6 years was 1,182. The total number of literate persons in Barwan was 5,664 (72.69% of the population over 6 years).

Civic administration

Police station
Burwan police station has jurisdiction over Burwan CD block.

Transport
State Highway 7 running from Rajgram (in Birbhum district) to Midnapore (in Paschim Medinipur district) passes through Burwan.

Healthcare
Burwan Rural Hospital, with 30 beds, is a major government facility in Burwan CD block.

See also - Healthcare in West Bengal

References

Villages in Murshidabad district